Williamston Community Schools (WCS) is the K-12 public school district centered in Williamston, Michigan. It includes portions of Okemos and a small sliver of Haslett. WCS is a part of the Ingham County Intermediate School District.

As of the 2017-2018 school year, Williamston Community Schools has a total enrollment count of 1,879 students and 102 classroom teachers.

History 
Williamston Community Schools began in 1874 as a large two story building in the center of town. This building was known as Williamston High School, and along with two additional school houses, this is what constituted Williamston Community Schools for a long period of time. Prior to this, the town utilized a few one-room school houses. These buildings were auctioned off privately in the late 1990s and early 2000s. The main high school building remained in operation until 1990, when it was replaced by a new Williamston High School building located on Vanneter Road. The previous high school building was purchased and renovated by a non-profit organization in 2016 and renamed to the "Commons of Williamston".

Williamston Middle School and Explorer Elementary were constructed sometime in the 1950s/1960s. Over time, they have received extensive renovations, and are still in use today.  Williamston Middle School served as the high school during the 1960s. Discovery Elementary was constructed around the year 2000 and is the newest building in Williamston Community Schools. A bond was drafted in 2006 to construct a third elementary school, but this was rejected.

In 2006, Granger Construction was contracted to expand Williamston High School. The building was expanded by 76,000 square feet, and featured a new gym, as well as a community pool and fitness center open to students and the public. More classrooms were also added, allowing for the expansion of academic opportunities in the district, including the foundation of the WCS Math and Science Academy.

Schools 

 Williamston Discovery Elementary (K - 2nd grade)
 Williamston Explorer Elementary (Preschool & 3rd - 5th)
 Williamston Middle School (6th - 8th)
 Williamston High School (9th - 12th)

External links
Williamston Community Schools

References

 
 
 
 

School districts in Michigan
Education in Ingham County, Michigan
1874 establishments in Michigan
School districts established in 1874